Khost Cricket Stadium or Loya Paktia Cricket Stadium is a cricket stadium in Khost, Afghanistan. The stadium was inaugurated on 30 December 2016, with more than 50,000 spectators present in the inaugural ceremony, a record crowd for any sport played in the country. The stadium was constructed with the assistance of Germany.

Khost Cricket Stadium is the fourth leading cricket stadium in Afghanistan, after Kandahar International Cricket Stadium, Ghazi Amanullah International Cricket Stadium in Jalalabad, and Alokozay Kabul International Cricket Ground in Kabul.

See also
Khost City Ground, another multi-purpose stadium in Khost, used for football and other sports
Loya Paktia, the larger cultural region around Khost

References

External links
 cricinfo

Cricket grounds in Afghanistan
Buildings and structures in Afghanistan
Khost
2016 establishments in Afghanistan